Jealousy is a 1945 American film noir crime film directed by Gustav Machatý starring John Loder, Jane Randolph, Karen Morley and Nils Asther.

Plot
A successful alcoholic writer is murdered and his wife is accused.

Cast

 John Loder as Dr. David Brent
 Jane Randolph as Janet Urban
 Karen Morley as Dr. Monica Anderson
 Nils Asther as Peter Urban
 Hugo Haas as Hugo Kral
 Holmes Herbert as Melvyn Russell
 Michael Mark as Shop Owner
 Mauritz Hugo as Bob
 Kid Chissell as Expressman

Reception

Critical response
Film critic Leonard Maltin did not like the film, writing, "[A] whodunit set in L.A. that, after a promising start, descends into mediocrity. Machaty's touch is still evident in unusual camera shots and montages."

References

External links
 
 
 

1945 films
1945 crime drama films
American crime drama films
American black-and-white films
Film noir
Republic Pictures films
Films directed by Gustav Machatý
1940s English-language films
1940s American films